Meyer–Womble Observatory (MWO) is an astronomical observatory owned and operated by the University of Denver.

Through a gift of $3.8 million from the estate of William Womble, construction of the facility began in 1995 and was completed in 1996.  Eric Meyer, M.D., an anesthesiologist who designed the dual-aperture  f/21 Ritchey-Chretien telescope, and his wife, Barbara, donated $1 million and brought the optical components personally from Chicago.  The optical/infrared telescopes saw first light in August 1997.

During the 2011–12 winter, the dome over the telescope was damaged by high winds, allowing snow to enter the observing area.  The telescope was secured in early April 2012 by a mountaineer who hiked to the summit.  A complete inspection of the damage did not take place until the road to the summit opened in May.  During the following summer, the remains of the old dome were demolished and a new dome was fabricated.  Installation of the new structure occurred on October 20, 2012.

Decommissioning
Citing a lack of funds and interest, the University of Denver began decommissioning the observatory in 2018. The facility will be razed and the site will be abandoned.

See also
 Chamberlin Observatory
 List of astronomical observatories

References

External links
 University of Denver - Department of Physics & Astronomy
 Meyer–Womble Observatory Clear Sky Clock Forecasts of observing conditions.

Astronomical observatories in Colorado
Buildings and structures in Clear Creek County, Colorado
University of Denver